Yelena Anatolyevna Zadorozhnaya (born 3 December 1977 in Ustkut) is a Russian runner who specializes in the 3000 metres, 5000 metres and 3000 metres steeplechase.

International competitions

Personal bests
800 metres - 2:02.31 min (1999)
1500 metres - 3:59.94 min (2002)
Mile run - 4:21.57 min (2004)
3000 metres - 8:25.40 min (2001)
5000 metres - 14:40.47 min (2001)
3000 metres steeplechase - 9:32.41 min (2005)

References

1977 births
Living people
People from Irkutsk Oblast
Sportspeople from Irkutsk Oblast
Russian female middle-distance runners
Russian female long-distance runners
Russian female steeplechase runners
Olympic female long-distance runners
Olympic athletes of Russia
Athletes (track and field) at the 2004 Summer Olympics
Athletes (track and field) at the 2008 Summer Olympics
World Athletics Championships athletes for Russia
European Athletics Championships medalists
Russian Athletics Championships winners